Statistics of Ekstraklasa for the 1952 season.

Overview
It was contested by 12 teams, and Ruch Chorzów won the championship.

Regular season

Group 1

Results

Group 2

Results

Final Games
Ruch Chorzów 7-0 Polonia Bytom
Polonia Bytom 0-0 Ruch Chorzów

Top goalscorers

References
Poland – List of final tables at RSSSF 

Ekstraklasa seasons
1
Pol
Pol